The men's 200 metre breaststroke competition at the 2014 Pan Pacific Swimming Championships took place on August 24 at the Gold Coast Aquatic Centre.  The last champion was Kosuke Kitajima of Japan.

This race consisted of four lengths of the pool, all in breaststroke.

Records
Prior to this competition, the existing world and Pan Pacific records were as follows:

Results
All times are in minutes and seconds.

Heats
The first round was held on August 24, at 12:55.

B Final 
The B final was held on August 24, at 20:54.

A Final 
The A final was held on August 24, at 20:54.

References

2014 Pan Pacific Swimming Championships